The Joel McCrea Ranch in Thousand Oaks, California is also known as the August DuMortier Ranch. The ranch is rare surviving example of the large cattle ranches and fields of grain which once dotted the Santa Rosa and Conejo valleys in eastern Ventura County.

One surviving building dates from 1890 from August DuMortier's ranch;  the main house, an avocado-shaped pool, and a cabana/poolhouse were built in 1933;  a maid's residence and various other contributing and non-contributing buildings date from later.

History
The ranch is historically significant for its association with actor Joel McCrea, a major star in the movie industry. The main house and some other buildings are also significant works of architect John Byers;  according to the NRHP nomination:Byers was a prominent regional architect, best known for his adobe and Spanish Colonial Revival designs. The Joel McCrea ranch house is a rare and very successful departure from Byers' usual period revivalism into the realm of the informal California Ranch style, just emerging in Southern California.

The ranch is at the bottom of the Norwegian Grade, a road built by settlers around 1900. The Norwegian Colony, at the north end of the Conejo Valley, needed a safe route to transport bales of hay and sacks of wheat and barley to the Oxnard Plain. This road allowed grain bound for San Francisco and England pass down the Santa Rosa Valley to the Hueneme Wharf.

The McCreas donated several hundred acres of the ranch to the newly formed Conejo Valley YMCA for the city of Thousand Oaks, California, both of which celebrated their 40th anniversaries in 2004.

See also
National Register of Historic Places listings in Ventura County, California

References

Ranches in California
Simi Hills
Buildings and structures in Thousand Oaks, California
Buildings and structures completed in 1933
Historic districts on the National Register of Historic Places in California
National Register of Historic Places in Ventura County, California
Ranches on the National Register of Historic Places in California
History of Thousand Oaks, California
1933 establishments in California